Logan Field , also known as Samson Municipal Airport, is a city-owned, public-use airport one nautical mile (2 km) southwest of the central business district of Samson, a city in Geneva County, Alabama, United States.

Facilities 
Logan Field has one asphalt paved runway designated 5/23 which measures 3,256 by 75 feet (992 by 23 m).

References

External links 

Airports in Alabama
Transportation buildings and structures in Geneva County, Alabama